Azizbek Haydarov  (Uzbek Cyrillic: Азизбек Ҳайдаров; born 8 July 1985 in Tashkent) is an Uzbek professional footballer who plays for PFC Lokomotiv Tashkent as a defensive midfielder.

International career
Haydarov has made 67 appearances for the Uzbekistan national football team since 2007 (as of 31 March 2015), including six qualifying matches for the 2010 FIFA World Cup.

He captained the Uzbekistan Olympic team in 2007. Haydarov scored for Uzbekistan at the 2011 AFC Asian Cup, in their group stage match against Kuwait. The goal is sometimes credited to Maksim Shatskikh, whose free kick Haydarov deflected into the Kuwait net for the opening goal of a 2–1 win.

International goals
Scores and results list Uzbekistan's goals tally first.

Honours

Bunyodkor
 Uzbek League (3): 2008, 2009, 2010
 Uzbek Cup (2): 2008, 2010
 AFC Champions League semifinal: 2008

References

External links 
 
 

1985 births
Living people
Sportspeople from Tashkent
Uzbekistani footballers
Uzbekistan international footballers
Place of birth missing (living people)
2011 AFC Asian Cup players
2015 AFC Asian Cup players
FC Bunyodkor players
Uzbekistani expatriate footballers
Expatriate footballers in the United Arab Emirates
Uzbekistani expatriate sportspeople in the United Arab Emirates
Footballers at the 2006 Asian Games
Al Shabab Al Arabi Club Dubai players
Ajman Club players
UAE Pro League players
Association football midfielders
Asian Games competitors for Uzbekistan